Tuition insurance is an insurance protecting students attending cost-intensive educational institutions - schools, colleges or universities - from the financial loss that may result from the student’s involuntary withdrawal from his or her studies. It usually covers withdrawals due to medical reasons and the death of the student’s legal guardian(s) by either refunding or covering the costs associated with attending the student’s institution. Tuition insurance may also cover student loans.

Tuition insurance can be obtained through educational institutions or directly from an insurance provider.  It can also be obtained as part of a student loan.  Most tuition insurance policies cover the cost of tuition in whole or partly if a student has to withdraw from his or her studies due to medical reasons; however, this may be limited to the first weeks of the semester. If the withdrawal is due to mental health reasons the reimbursement rarely exceeds 60%.

Tuition insurance has existed since 1930. It benefits both students and educational institutions since it may cover the money a student owes an educational institution in case the tuition payer can no longer cover these costs.

References 

Education finance
Types of insurance